Hadley Kay (born ) is a Canadian film, stage, television, and voice actor best known for his appearances in The Care Bears Movie, Care Bears Movie II: A New Generation, and Popples.

Career
At age six, he made his film debut opposite Bill Murray in the 1979 comedy Meatballs. Kay also appeared in Superman II, the Star Wars-based animated series Ewoks, Inspector Gadget, Beverly Hills Teens, and the earlier The Raccoons specials. Kay was the first voice actor to provide the voice of Scooby-Doofollowing the death of Don Messick. His other television credits include guest appearances in The Littlest Hobo, Bizarre, Kung Fu: The Legend Continues, Bakugan: Gundalian Invaders, and Bakugan: Mechtanium Surge.

Filmography

References

External links
 Official website
 
 

Living people
Canadian male stage actors
Canadian male television actors
Canadian male voice actors
1970s births
1973 births